Louisiana's 10th State Senate district is one of 39 districts in the Louisiana State Senate. It has been represented by Republican Kirk Talbot since 2020, succeeding fellow Republican Daniel Martiny.

Geography
District 10 is based entirely in Jefferson Parish along Lake Pontchartrain, including some or all of the Greater New Orleans suburbs of Metairie, Kenner, Harahan, Elmwood, and River Ridge.

The district overlaps with Louisiana's 1st and 2nd congressional districts, and with the 78th, 79th, 82nd, and 92nd districts of the Louisiana House of Representatives.

Recent election results
Louisiana uses a jungle primary system. If no candidate receives 50% in the first round of voting, when all candidates appear on the same ballot regardless of party, the top-two finishers advance to a runoff election.

2019

2015

2011

Federal and statewide results in District 10

References

Louisiana State Senate districts
Jefferson Parish, Louisiana